Antonio Dominguez or Domínguez may refer to:

Antonio Domínguez Ortiz (1909–2003), Spanish historian
Antonio Dominguez Richa (1932–2020), Panamanian politician
Antonio Domínguez (footballer) (born 1993), Spanish footballer
Antonio Dominguez (The Bold and the Beautiful), fictional character